The 2014 Australian Football International Cup was the fifth edition of the Australian Football International Cup, an international Australian rules football competition run by the Australian Football League.

It was contested between Saturday August 9 to Saturday August 23, with games played in Melbourne. All three previous champions (Ireland, New Zealand and Papua New Guinea) participated in the tournament.

Men's tournament

There are 18 nations competing in the 2014 Tournament. Of these, 15 competed in the previous tournament; Indonesia and Pakistan make their debuts, while Finland return having previously competed in 2008. The teams were seeded into three pools of six to decide which teams would play each other, though all teams will be ranked on a single ladder.

First round (Days 1-3)

Ladder Till Day 3

The top four teams at the end of Day 3 progress to the International Cup Semi-finals. The other teams will play another match, depending on their ladder position, with those results added to the Ladder to decide Day 5 matchups.

The 5th to 12th-placed teams will play in Division 1 for the remainder of the tournament, and the 13th-placed team onwards will play in Division 2.

Semi-finals (Day 4)
Note: Ladder positions in this section refer to standings after Day 3 of the tournament.

Divisional Matches (Day 4)

Final Division Ladders

Division 1

Division 2

Positional Finals (Days 5 & 6)
Note: Ladder positions in this section refer to standings after Day 4 of the tournament (above).

Grand Final (Day 6)

Final standings

Women's tournament

For the second consecutive time, there was a concurrent Women's tournament alongside the Men's competition. Seven teams participated from five countries - the United States and Canada both fielded two teams.

Round-Robin Matches

Each team played four matches across five matchdays. Matches played on Saturday 16 August - the "Community Round" of the tournament - were played as curtain-raisers to other amateur Metropolitan and Country football matches to be confirmed; all other games in the round-robin were held at Royal Park, Melbourne.

Ladder

Finals
After the round-robin tournament, the last placed team was eliminated. The other six teams played one extra match to decide the final placings, with the top two teams on the ladder playing in the Women's International Cup Grand Final.

World Teams

Men's World Team

Women's World Team

See also
 Australian Football League
 Australian Football International Cup
 Australian rules football around the world

References

Australian Football International Cup
International